Sylvia Benton FSA, FSA Scot (18 August 1887 – 12 September 1985) was a British classical archaeologist, best known for her work on ancient Greece and the Sculptor's Cave in Moray, Scotland. Benton was elected a Fellow of the Society of Antiquaries of Scotland in 1928 and a Fellow of the Society of Antiquaries in London in 1937.

Early life and education
Sylvia Benton was born 18 August 1887 in India at Lahore. At the time, her father, Alexander Hay Benton, was a judge of the Chief Court of India. Her mother was Rose Sheriffston from Moray, Scotland. She attended
St Margaret's Primary School in Polmont, Scotland and Wimbledon High School in London. From 1907 to 1910, Benton attended Girton College, Cambridge, studying the Classics. After Cambridge, she taught high school in Manchester and returned to Cambridge to gain a Teachers Training Certificate. Thereafter, she held teaching posts in schools at Oldham, Reading and Clapham for fifteen years. During this time she developed an interest in classical archeology and the study of Homer.

Benton traveled throughout Greece in 1926. In 1927 to 1928 she was a student at the British School at Athens and assisted archeologist and school instructor, W.A. Heurtley, with excavations in Chalkidiki in Northern Greece. Benton was turned down for the 1928-1929 term at the school, because she had disobeyed an order from the school's Director not to climb the Taygetus mountains alone. She continued to assist Heurtley in his excavations in 1929. Benton was accepted at the School of Athens for the 1929-1930 school term. She participated in excavations with Heurtley in Macedonia and Servia in 1930, and Armenochori in 1931.

She continued to travel throughout Greece, often accompanying archaeologists, including Ralegh Radford and John Pendlebury. She returned to Oxford to study for the Diploma in Classical Archaeology, which she obtained in 1932. Later, in 1934, she went on to acquire a B. Litt. with the dissertation, the Barony of Odysseus.

Career
From 1928 to 1930, Benton was in Scotland, excavating the Sculptor's Cave at Covesea on the south shore of Moray Firth. She discovered evidence of human occupation dating to the Bronze Age, the late Roman Iron Age, and the medieval period. Uncovering layers of sand on the floor of the cave, Benton found human remains, burnt deposits in the soil and evidence of ancient stone hearths. A large quantity of artefacts were uncovered that provided evidence of the dates of human occupation of the cave from the Late Bronze Age to the medieval period. She later determined that Bronze Age artefacts found in the cave were similar to objects found in Central Europe during the same time period. In a report to the Scottish Society of Antiquaries in 1931, she proposed that the human occupants at the site had immigrated from Central Europe, which was contrary to the views of the Scottish Antiquarian community. Thirty years later, her views were widely accepted and the 'Covesea phase' was recognized as a significant time period of the Late Bronze Age in Scotland. Benton was elected as a Fellow of the Society of Antiquaries of Scotland in 1928.

Benton returned to Greece in 1930 and assisted in excavations under the direction of Huertley at Ithaca from 1930 to 1932 and in 1934. She also participated in the excavation of a cave at Astakos in 1932 and Zakynthos with Hilda Lorimer in 1934. . After Heurtley's retirement from the school in 1937, Benton began excavating on her own in North Ithaca, at Tris Langades, from 1937 to 1938.  She returned to excavate at Aeots in 1938, where she uncovered important finds of Geometric and Archaic periods of Ancient Greece. She continued to analyze those finds at the Vathy museum in Ithaca for several years and published several articles on her work.

Sylvia moved back to England late in August 1939 at the beginning of the second World War and found war work in London, initially for Naval Hydrography. Later she worked with London's fire-fighting brigade at night. Benton was badly injured in the bombing of London in 1945. By the spring of 1947. with the war over, she was able to return to Greece and work at the Vathy museum in Ithaca. The 1953 Ionian earthquake devastated the islands, killed several hundred people and destroyed many buildings. After the earthquake, Benton participated in the restoration of the museums at Vathy and Stavros. During this time period, she divided her time between Ithaca and her home in Oxford, England.

In the 1950s, Sylvia focused her research on the themes of monsters, winds, birds in Greek art and literature. She authored several publications on the topics, but her work of twelve years on birds was not accepted for publication.
When Benton had completed her work at the Sculptor's Cave in 1930, she left behind a number of undisturbed deposits and artefacts on the floor of the cave for future archaeologists. Fifty years later in 1979, Benton returned to the cave during its excavation by archaeologists Ian and Alexandra Shepherd, to retrieve the remaining artefacts.  Benton, at the age of 92, climbed down a high scaffolding on the cliff face above the cave to view the progress of the excavation by the archeological team.

Benton moved to Lossiemouth, Moray in 1970 when she retired, and later to Kincraig in 1984, where her family was located. After a fall, she died in an Inverness hospital on 12 September 1985, at the age of 98.

Selected publications 

 1928 "Antiquities from Thiaki", BSA 29, 113–116.
 1931 "The Ionian Islands", BSA 32, 213–246.  "The Excavation of the Sculptor’s Cave, Covesea, Morayshire", Proc. Soc. Ant. Soc. 65, 177–216.  "An unlucky sword from Mycenae", Geographical Journal.
 1935 "Excavations at Ithaca III, The Cave of at Polis, 1" BSA 35, 45–73.
 1937 "Herakles and Eurystheus at Knossos", JHS 57, 38–43.
 1939 "Excavations at Ithaca III; The cave at Polis, 2" BSA 39, 1–51.
 1949 "Second thoughts on "Mycenaean" pottery in Ithaca", BSA 44, 307–312.
 1950 "The dating of Horses on Stands and Spectacle fibulae in Greece", JHS 70, 16–22.
 1953 "Further Excavations at Aetos", BSA 48, 255–358.
 1959 "The Cup of Arkesilas", Archaeology 12, 3, 178–82.
 1961 "Cattle egrets and bustards in Greek art", JHS 81, 42–55.
 1970 "Nereids and two Attic pyxides", JHS 90, 193–194.

References 

1887 births
1985 deaths
People educated at Wimbledon High School
Alumni of Girton College, Cambridge
British archaeologists
British women archaeologists
Fellows of the Society of Antiquaries of London
Fellows of the Society of Antiquaries of Scotland
British women historians
20th-century archaeologists
British people in colonial India